On 5 September 1975 a bomb exploded in the lobby of the Hilton Hotel on Park Lane, London, killing two people and injuring 63.

Bombing 
Ten minutes before the explosion, the Daily Mail newspaper received a warning by telephone. Having been notified, Scotland Yard immediately sent three officers to investigate, but they were not able to evacuate the building before the bomb exploded at 12:18 BST. The Provisional IRA claimed responsibility for the bombing.
Police worked quickly to clear the area after the explosion fearing there could be another device nearby.
The blast caused extensive damage to the hotel and neighbouring shops with broken glass spread over a wide area.
Witnesses said police arrived only five minutes before the bomb went off, and it is not clear whether the hotel was warned before they turned up.
A spokesman for the Metropolitan Police said an officer telephoned the Hilton shortly after receiving the warning, but the hotel denied this. "A policeman was just telling the assistant manager that he had better evacuate when the bomb went off," said press officer Anne Crewdson.

Second bombing 
A second attempt to bomb the London Hilton hotel was made on 7 September 1992. The explosion caused slight damage in a lavatory on the ground floor but nobody was injured.

Footnotes

Explosions in 1975
Provisional IRA bombings in London
1975 murders in the United Kingdom
Hilton bombing
Hilton Hotels & Resorts hotels
Attacks on hotels in Europe
1975 crimes in the United Kingdom
September 1975 events in the United Kingdom
1970s in the City of Westminster
Crime in the City of Westminster
Building bombings in London
Hotel bombings